Kristers Freibergs (born July 3, 1992) is a Latvian professional ice hockey defenceman. He is currently playing for HK Riga of the Russian Minor Hockey League.

Freibergs made his European Elite debut with HK Liepājas Metalurgs of the Belarusian Extraleague during the 2010-11 season.

He participated at the 2012 World Junior Ice Hockey Championships as a member of the Latvia men's national junior ice hockey team.

References

1992 births
Living people
HK Liepājas Metalurgs players
HK Riga players
Latvian ice hockey defencemen